Hagnodorus of Amphitrope was the brother-in-law of Critias (460–403 BC), the ancient Athenian political figure and author.  Both were associated with the Thirty Tyrants of Athens.

References
 Lysias, Against Agoratus, 55.

5th-century BC Athenians